The 1999 African Judo Championships were the 21st edition of the African Judo Championships, organised by the African Judo Union and were held in Johannesburg, South Africa from 11 September 1999 to 14 September 1999.

References

External links
 

1999
African Championships
Judo competitions in South Africa
September 1999 sports events in Africa